The 1975 Paris–Roubaix was the 73rd edition of the Paris–Roubaix cycle race and was held on 13 April 1975. The race started in Compiègne and finished in Roubaix. The race was won by Roger De Vlaeminck of the Brooklyn team.

General classification

References

Paris–Roubaix
Paris-Roubaix
Paris-Roubaix
Paris-Roubaix
Paris-Roubaix